The Karate Killers is a 1967 American spy film and feature-length film version of The Man from U.N.C.L.E.s third season two-part episode "The Five Daughters Affair".  The episodes were originally broadcast in the United States on March 31, 1967, and April 7, 1967, on NBC.  It, as does the television series, stars Robert Vaughn and David McCallum.  It is the sixth such feature film that used as its basis a reedited version of one or more episodes from the series. Joan Crawford, Telly Savalas, Herbert Lom, Diane McBain, Jill Ireland, and Kim Darby are among those in the cast. The film was directed by Barry Shear and written by Norman Hudis with the story by Boris Ingster.

Production
The first four U.N.C.L.E. feature films made significant changes and additions to the episodes from which they were drawn.  This movie, like the one immediately before it (“The Spy in the Green Hat”), makes relatively minimal changes to the episodes.  No major scenes were added or removed, but various trims were made to fit the episodes into the running time of the film and musical cues and accompanying music were sometimes changed.

Also changed were some short scenes that became more violent or sexy than generally shown on American network television at the time.  For example, both the dead bodies of Amanda True and Randolph are shown with eyes closed in the TV episode; in the movie, their eyes are open and Randolph's death is more brutal.  In some fight scenes, the movie version contains more violent images compared to the episodes (e.g., a bloody face in the London bar, greater violence in the Japanese temple).  Margo De Fanzini's initial nudity is seen in both versions, but is more pronounced in the movie.

Other changes were made for apparently no reason other than artistic.  For example:  there is a scene that is essentially identical in both the episode and the movie, but while in the episode a Japanese girl calls Sandy True “kid”, in the movie the same girl calls her “teeny-bopper”.

Like One of Our Spies Is Missing, the film also required a new score (by Gerald Fried) due to "The Five Daughters Affair" being tracked with music from other episodes.

Synopsis
U.N.C.L.E. agents  Napoleon Solo (Robert Vaughn) and Illya Kuryakin (David McCallum) are being attacked with missiles from small helicopters while on their way to see scientist Dr. Simon True (Jim Bowles).  The attackers work for the villainous THRUSH organization. Although they fail to stop the agents, are the titular “Karate Killers”

Dr. True has discovered a process to extract gold from sea water.  Fearing theft, he hid the formula, saying someone would have to “hunt down the four winds” to find it. But during his presentation of the process to U.N.C.L.E., he dies from apparently natural causes (though we later discover is due to Randolph's doing). True's dying words are that his daughter is the key to finding the formula.

As the head of U.N.C.L.E., Alexander Waverly (Leo G. Carroll) informs Solo and Kuryakin that the dead man has four step-daughters and one biological daughter, Sandy True (Kim Darby). The consensus is that Dr. True sent each of his four step-daughters something that, when assembled, will mean something to Sandy and from which the formula can be discovered.

Dr. True's widow, Amanda (Joan Crawford) was having a love affair with THRUSH operative Randolph (Herbert Lom), but he was only using her to get closer to Dr. True's notes and formula. With no further use for her, Randolph orders her murdered by the "Karate Killers". Finding her body, the agents recruit Sandy to come with them as they find her step-sisters.

First, they visit Rome in search of Margo (Diane McBain), who has married Count Valeriano De Fanzini (Telly Savalas). The Count is keeping Margo naked and captive in his ancestral home, having married her for money only to learn she had none. Solo and Kuryakin rescue Margo, fight with Randolph and the Karate Killers (who have followed them to Rome), and are saved by Sandy's quick thinking. The Count and Margo make up after Sandy's discovery of a hidden treasure and give the U.N.C.L.E. team the only thing that Dr. True has sent Margo of late: a photograph of himself with an obvious formula in the picture.

Analysis by U.N.C.L.E. shows the formula to be nonsense, so the agents conclude that it is one-quarter of the full formula. They next head to London, where they find Sandy's step-sister Imogen (Jill Ireland) arrested by a constable for indecent exposure (a bikini). Solo posts bail and they go to Imogen's nightclub, fight again with Randolph and the Karate Killers, then are saved by constables, one of whom (Terry-Thomas) catches Imogen's eye romantically. Sandy discovers a similar photo of her father in Imogen's dressing room, but with a different formula in the background.

With half the four photos, the team heads to the Swiss Alps, where step-sister Yvonne (Danielle De Metz) lives in a hotel but is behind in paying her bills. Randolph, having gotten there before U.N.C.L.E., pays her debt and requests she give him the photo of her step-father. Solo and Kuryakin fight the Karate Killers on skis, and Sandy finds the photo before anyone else. Yvonne and wealthy boyfriend Carl (Curd Jurgens) resolve an argument and make up. Randolph intercepts the team on an U.N.C.L.E. private jet, takes the three photos, then parachutes out leaving the rest to die. Sandy is able to escape her bonds and frees the two agents. The plane lands safely.

The fourth photo of Dr. True has been published in a magazine. U.N.C.L.E. determines that scientifically they are still make no sense. When the letters in the formulas are rearranged, they spell “Japanese Lullaby”. Sandy has no clue what this means but they take her to Japan anyway. Randolph, having determined the same thing, follows.

The U.N.C.L.E. team is assaulted several times in Japan by the Karate Killers, Sandy is kidnapped but rescued by geishas. She finally remembers a Japanese man who sang her lullabies as a child. U.N.C.L.E. agents find the man, who gives Sandy the formula that her father sent him for safekeeping. At that moment Randolph and the Karate Killers, who have followed them again, overpower the team and take the formula.

Randolph takes the three to the THRUSH central facility at the pole (north or south is not specified), which serves as their main research and manufacturing station. The facility has been reconfigured to use Dr. True's process and manufacture gold from sea water. Randolph wants to keep the captives alive long enough for them to see THRUSH's success, but Solo and Kuryakin escape from their cell using explosives hidden in Solo's shoelaces. They sabotage the plant and destroy the gold-making machinery.  Randolph is killed in the process and covered in a film of gold dust.

Solo, Kuryakin, Sandy, one of the geishas, and Waverly all travel to London to attend the double wedding of Imogen and the constable, and Yvonne and Carl. The Count and Contessa are also in attendance and it becomes clear that, absent a father, the girls' “U.N.C.L.E.” has paid for the weddings.

Cast 
 Robert Vaughn – Napoleon Solo
 David McCallum – Illya Kuryakin
 Leo G. Carroll – Alexander Waverly
 Kim Darby – Sandy True
 Herbert Lom – Randolph
 Joan Crawford – Amanda True
 Telly Savalas – Count Valeriano De Fanzini
 Diane McBain – Contessa Margo De Fanzini
 Jill Ireland – Imogen Smythe
 Terry-Thomas – Constable
 Danielle De Metz – Yvonne
 Curd Jürgens – Carl von Kessen
 Jim Boles – Dr. Simon True
 Irene Tsu – Reikko
 Rick Traeger – Hotel clerk
 Julie Ann Johnson – U.N.C.L.E. girl
 Sharyn Hillyer – U.N.C.L.E. girl
 Dick Crockett – Karate killer
 Paul Baxley – Karate killer

Songs 
The band Every Mother's Son’s song "Come on Down to My Boat", which went to #6 on the Billboard charts in July 1967, is used in both the opening credits to the film and in a London nightclub as a fight breaks out.  The televised version of the story only had the band in the nightclub, and images of the band playing the song over the credits in the movie were simply copies of the nightclub scenes.

Release

The episodes were originally broadcast in the United States on March 31, 1967, and April 7, 1967, on NBC. The Karate Killers was released on DVD by Warner Archive Collection on November 2, 2011.

See also
List of American films of 1967

References

Sources

External links 
 Site with a detailed chronology of the production of the show and movie
 

American spy films
1967 films
1960s spy films
Metro-Goldwyn-Mayer films
Films with screenplays by Norman Hudis
Films directed by Barry Shear
Films scored by Gerald Fried
Films edited from television programs
The Man from U.N.C.L.E.
1960s English-language films
1960s American films